Ulus is a quarter in Ankara, Turkey and is located at the center of the capital city. It was once the heart of old Ankara.  The name means "tribe, nation" in Turkish.

It is now a predominantly a commercial and tourist area made up of banks, malls, shops, hotels, businesses, restaurants, and many historical sites. The first Turkish Grand National Assembly convened here in 1923 in the parliament building at Ulus Square, which still stands in original. Across from the historical parliament building is the city's oldest hotel, the Ankara Palas, where Atatürk had stayed. Ankara Citadel, another historical attraction, is located immediate east of Ulus
.

In the center of Ulus Square, there is a memorial called Monument of Republic, which was erected in 1927 as a symbol of the Turkish War of Independence.

The Statue of Victory at Ulus Square was depicted on the reverse of the Turkish 2 lira banknote of 1939-1952 and of the 50 lira banknotes of 1951–1979.

A shopping mall situated next to Ulus square was subject to a terrorist bombing on 22 May 2007.

Places of interest
 Temple of Augustus
 Column of Julianus (362 AD)
 Roman Bath (3rd century AD)
 War of Independence Museum (Kurtuluş Savaşı Müzesi) - originally the first parliament building
 Ankara Ethnography Museum
 Hacı Bayram Mosque

See also
 2007 Ankara bombing

References

 
Neighbourhoods of Ankara
Altındağ, Ankara